= Miners Hill =

1962 novel by Michael O' Malley

- Author: Michael O' Malley
- Language: English
- Genre: Novel
- Publisher: Harper & Brothers
- Publication date: 1962
- Publication place: United States
- Media type: Print (hardback)
- Pages: 306
- OCLC: 5060718

Miners Hill is a coming of age novel by the American writer Michael O'Malley. First published in 1962 by Harper & Brothers, it was his debut novel. set during the 1930s and 1940s in the fictional locale of Brasston, a steel town on the Monongahela River twenty miles south of Pittsburgh, Pennsylvania.

It tells the story of Pat Riley, whose mother would have him escape the life of the mills by entering the priesthood of the Roman Catholic Church.
